James Walter Birch (5 October 1917 – 1991) was an English footballer who played as a central defender for  Rochdale.

In May 1939 he signed professional forms with Huddersfield Town but never made a first team appearance, due to the outbreak of World War II.

During the war he played in the war-time league for Huddersfield Town, Mossley, Oldham Athletic, Leeds United and Rochdale.

In August 1946, he made his debut for Rochdale, and over seven seasons, he clocked up 243 league appearances and 10 goals, mostly from the penalty spot. He retired in 1953.

Birch died in 1991.

References

Huddersfield Town A.F.C. players
Rochdale A.F.C. players
1917 births
1991 deaths
People from Ecclesfield
Footballers from Sheffield
English footballers
Association football defenders